Matam may refer to:
Bramham Gari Matham, a pilgrim in India.
Matam, Senegal, a city in Senegal
Matam Region, a region of Senegal
Matam, Haifa, a business park in Haifa, Israel
Matam, Guinea, a district of the capital Conakry
Mätam, the term used in South Asia for the act of self-flagellation during the Shia remembrance of Muharram
Ma'tam (مأتم), a Shia congregation hall in Bahrain, known as a Hussainia or Imambargah elsewhere.